Moscow Raceway is an FIA-approved motor racing venue, which is situated in the Volokolamsky District of Moscow Oblast, near the villages of Sheludkovo and Fedyukovo,  from Moscow, Russia. It opened on 13 July 2012 for its first event as the fifth round of the World Series by Renault becoming the first major international motor-sport race track event in Russia. It is an FIA Grade 1 circuit, which means that it has all the requirements necessary to host a Formula One race, though the Sochi Autodrom previously hosted Russian Formula One races during the existence of the Russian Grand Prix as a World Championship event.

History

In September 2008, it was revealed that work was to begin on a Formula One circuit to be located at the village of Fedyukovo, Volokolamsky District. Hans Geist, who at that time was the managing director of the project, stated that the track could pass an FIA inspection by June 2010, and that even without Formula 1 the project would be profitable staging either DTM or MotoGP. The cost of the project overall was 4.5 billion rub when it opened on 13 July 2012.

Design

Moscow Raceway was designed to be categorized FIA 1T and FIM A, which would allow motorsport competition at any level, from national championships in auto and motorcycle racing, to Formula 1 and MotoGP. The circuit was finally classified as a FIM B grade course following inspections on 18 July 2012, one grade down from what was expected.

Construction

Built under a Russian–German joint venture named "Autobahn", the general contractor for construction of buildings and race track to international level was Stroytech-5, a member of a group of companies Stroytech. Sub-contract partners included Siemens, while Sergei Krylov was working as an adviser.

After initially signing a deal with Bernie Ecclestone in 2008, the project was dropped from the 2010 Formula 1 calendar in early 2009, and construction stopped. Construction resumed in June 2010, with the new contractor agreeing to complete the road section of the track by the end of 2011.

Race history

The first events held at the circuit were part of the World Series by Renault on 13–15 July 2012, where it also became the second international motor-sport event in Russian history after the FIA European Truck Racing Championship event took place in the Smolenskring in July 2010. The first race itself was the 5th round of the Formula Renault 3.5 series, which was won by Dutchman Robin Frijns.  The first Russian to win a race there soon followed with Daniil Kvyat winning both races of the Eurocup Formula Renault 2.0 series round in a row. A total of 10 Russian drivers were at the event including former 3.5 series Champion Mikhail Aleshin; many taking over other drivers for just this event.

On 21 July 2013, during the World Superbike weekend, Italian rider Andrea Antonelli was killed in the World Supersport race after being hit on the back straight by fellow rider Lorenzo Zanetti. Antonelli was airlifted to hospital where he died of massive head trauma, and the rest of the weekend's action was cancelled due to the torrential downpour.

Configurations

Layouts

Events

 Current

 May: Russian Endurance Challenge
 July: Russian Endurance Challenge
 September: Russian Circuit Racing Series, Russian Endurance Challenge

 Former

 Blancpain GT Series (2015)
 Deutsche Tourenwagen Masters (2013–2017)
 FIA Formula 3 European Championship (2014)
 FIA GT1 World Championship (2012)
 Formula Masters Russia (2012–2015)
 Formula Renault Eurocup (2014)
 SMP F4 Championship (2015–2019)
 Superbike World Championship (2012–2013)
 World Series by Renault (2012–2014)
 World Touring Car Championship FIA WTCC Race of Russia (2013–2015)

Lap records
The official race lap records at the Moscow Raceway are listed as:

See also
 Autodrom Moscow

References

External links
Moscow Raceway official site  

Motorsport venues in Russia
Buildings and structures in Moscow Oblast
World Touring Car Championship circuits
Racing circuits designed by Hermann Tilke
Sports venues completed in 2008
2008 establishments in Russia
Sports venues in Moscow Oblast